Sickle Ridge is a ridge in East Antarctica. The ridge has a distinctive sickle shape. The Murcray Heights cluster of peaks is located at its far south end. Named descriptively by New Zealand Geographic Board (1994) following work in the area in the 1987-88 field season by New Zealand Geographic Board geologist Alan Sherwood.

Ridges of Victoria Land
Scott Coast